
De Oude Rosmolen is a defunct restaurant located in Hoorn in the Netherlands. It was a fine dining restaurant that was awarded one Michelin stars in the period 1986-1989 and two Michelin stars is the period 1990–2000.

The head chef was Constant Fonk.

The restaurant was located in a 17th-century building that once contained a bakery with its own mill. The mill was driven by a horse, which gave the building its name "Rosmolen" (translation from Dutch: "Horse mill").

See also
List of Michelin starred restaurants in the Netherlands

Sources and references 

Restaurants in the Netherlands
Michelin Guide starred restaurants in the Netherlands
Defunct restaurants in the Netherlands